Charles I may refer to:

Kings and emperors 
 Charlemagne (742–814), numbered Charles I in the lists of Holy Roman Emperors and French  kings
 Charles I of Anjou (1226–1285), also king of Albania, Jerusalem, Naples and Sicily
 Charles I of Hungary (1288–1342), also king of Croatia
 Charles I of Navarre (1294–1328), also Charles IV of France 
 Charles I of Bohemia (1316–1378), also Charles IV, Holy Roman Emperor
 Charles I of Norway (1408–1470), also Charles VIII of Sweden
 Charles I of Spain (1500–1558), also Charles V, Holy Roman Emperor
 Charles I of England, Scotland, and Ireland (1600–1649)
 Charles I of Romania or Carol I (1839–1914)
 Charles I of Portugal or Carlos I (1863–1908)
 Charles I of Austria or Karl I (1887–1922), also Charles IV of Hungary

Others 
 Charles I, Duke of Lorraine (953–993)
 Charles I, Count of Flanders (1083–1127/86–1127), called Charles the Good
 Charles, Count of Valois or Charles I, count of Alençon 1291–1325
 Charles I, Lord of Monaco (died 1357)
 Charles I, Duke of Bourbon (1401–1456)
 Charles I, Count of Nevers (1414–1464)
 Charles I, Margrave of Baden-Baden (died 1475)
 Charles I, Count of Armagnac (1425–1497)
 Charles I, Count of Ligny (1448–1530)
 Charles I, Duke of Savoy (1468–1490), titular king of Cyprus, Jerusalem, and Armenia
 Charles I, Duke of Münsterberg-Oels (1476–1536)
 Charles I, Duke of Mecklenburg (1540–1610)
 Charles I, Duke of Elbeuf (1556–1605)
 Charles I, Count Palatine of Zweibrücken-Birkenfeld (1560–1600)
 Charles I, Duke of Mantua and Montferrat or Charles Gonzaga (1580–1637)
 Charles I Louis, Elector Palatine (1617–1680)
 Charles I, Landgrave of Hesse-Kassel (1654–1730)
 Charles I, Landgrave of Hesse-Philippsthal (1682–1770)
 Charles I, Duke of Brunswick-Wolfenbüttel (1713–1780)
 Charles I, Duke of Parma (1716–1788), also Charles III of Spain

Artworks and literature 
 Charles I in Three Positions, an oil painting of Charles I of England by Sir Anthony van Dyck (1635 or 1636)
 King Charles I (play), an 1737 play by William Havard 
 Charles the First (play), an 1834 tragedy by Mary Russell Mitford
 Charles the First (1982 painting), by American artist Jean-Michel Basquiat

See also 
 Carl I (disambiguation)